Kolmoskanava (also known as TV3 and informally as Kolmonen) was a Finnish free-to-air television station owned and operated by Oy Kolmostelevisio Ab, a joint venture between MTV Oy, Yle and Nokia. The channel was launched on December 1, 1986, and closed on the New Year's Eve night of December 31, 1992 with MTV3 starting its broadcasts simultaneously. Being the first nationwide commercial channel in Finland, Kolmoskanava did not produce any of its programmes themselves, instead relying on imported programmes (mostly TV shows and movies from North America), sports and a small number of Finnish programmes, most notably the bingo game show Megavisa, which aired from 1991 until 1992 on Kolmoskanava, and from 1993 until 1995 on its successor channel MTV3.

External links
Kolmoskanava archive

Defunct television channels in Finland
Television channels and stations established in 1986
Television channels and stations disestablished in 1992